Proximity-1 Space Link Protocol is a short haul delivery communications protocol designed to establish a two-way communications link between a lander and an orbiter, negotiate data rate and communications mode, and reliably deliver data during short orbiter-to-surface contacts. 

Developed by Consultative Committee for Space Data Systems and documented in a number of CCSDS Recommendations
Proximity-1 is implemented on Mars Exploration Rovers, Mars Odyssey, Mars Reconnaissance Orbiter, Mars Express as well as on Phoenix Mars Lander.

The frequency band used by this protocol is in the 70-centimeter band so as to reduce complexity of the ground craft, using these frequencies:
 437.1000 MHz
 440.7425 MHz
 444.3850 MHz
 448.0275 MHz

However, using this protocol over the standard CCSDS frequency bands is perfectly acceptable if the UHF allocation is not usable.

References

External links 
Mars Relay Operations: Application of CCSDS Proximity-1 Space Data Link Protocol

Network protocols
Space standards
Consultative Committee for Space Data Systems